"I Can't Breathe" is a song by H.E.R. released on June 19, 2020. It was written by H.E.R., D'Mile  and Tiara Thomas and produced by D'Mile. It reached number 20 on Billboards Hot R&B Songs. The song won Song of the Year at the 63rd Annual Grammy Awards, serving as H.E.R.'s first ever win in this category.

Critical reception 
Patricia Sanchez of Grimy Goods wrote: "While it may be hard for some to put into words the anger, frustration or pain felt after witnessing the death of George Floyd, yet another innocent, black individual lost to a deep and systemic issue in our society, H.E.R. finds the strength and wherewithal to transcend her anger into a meaningful and eloquent piece of protest art." Elizabeth Aubrey of NME called the song "powerful", while Billboard described the single as "moving".

Accolades
At the 63rd Annual Grammy Awards, "I Can't Breathe" won the Song of the Year; it  marks  H.E.R's first win and second song to be nominated in this category after "Hard Place" (2020).

Charts

Music video 
The music video for H.E.R.'s "I Can't Breathe" was released on June 26, 2020, on YouTube, and directed by Shane Adams. As of 2021, the video has received over 1.9 million views on YouTube. The music video has the song accompanying footage of different marches around the world protesting police brutality and systemic racism. The video pays tribute to victims of police brutality by displaying their names throughout the music video, some of those include George Floyd, Ahmaud Arbery, and Philando Castile.

The music video was nominated for and won both MTV's 2020 Video For Good Award and MTV Europe's 2020 award of the same name.

Live performances 
H.E.R. performed "I Can't Breathe" live in 2020 as a part of iHeartRadio's Living Room Concert Series Presented by State Farm. The artist also performed the song live for Apple Music on June 26, 2020 as a part of their Black Music Month.

See also 

 Institutional racism
 Murder of George Floyd

References

2020 songs
2020 singles
Grammy Award for Song of the Year
H.E.R. songs
MTV Video Music Award for Best Video with a Social Message
RCA Records singles
Songs written by D'Mile
Songs written by Tiara Thomas
Songs written by H.E.R.
Black Lives Matter art